Penicillium vinaceum is a species of fungus in the genus Penicillium which was isolated from soil of a soybean field in New Caledonia.

References

Further reading 
 

virgatum
Fungi described in 2005